The women's ski cross event in freestyle skiing at the 2014 Winter Olympics in Sochi, Russia took place on 21 February 2014.

Maria Komissarova of Russia, who qualified for the event, had broken her spine on 15 February while training in Sochi and had to be operated on the spot. She was flown to Munich for further treatment the following day.

Results
The event was started at 11:45.

Seeding

Elimination round

1/8 finals
The 32 seeds advanced to the 1/8 finals. From here, they participated in four-person elimination races, with the top two from each race advancing. 

Heat 1

Heat 2

Heat 3

Heat 4

Heat 5

Heat 6

Heat 7

Heat 8

Quarterfinals
The top 2 from each heat of the 1/8 round advanced to the 1/4 round. From here, they participated in four-person elimination races, with the top two from each race advancing.

Heat 1

Heat 2

Heat 3

Heat 4

Semifinals
The top 2 from each heat of the 1/4 round advanced to the semifinals. From here, they participated in four-person elimination races, with the top two from each race advancing to the final and the third and fourth entering a classification race.

Heat 1

Heat 2

Finals

Small Final

Big Final

References

Women's freestyle skiing at the 2014 Winter Olympics